Johannes Christiaan de Wet (1912–1990) was South Africa's most influential jurist and teacher of law.

Biography 
Born as a farmer's son in the Orange Free State, he studied law at Stellenbosch, attaining doctorates there and in Leiden. After  World War II forced him to return to South Africa in 1942, he taught law at Stellenbosch from 1942 to 1972, making his faculty one of the leading faculties of law in the country. Afterwards, he taught Roman law and comparative law at the University of Cape Town from 1976 to 1981.

Academic work 
Among his many publications, the most notable were his seminal textbooks Kontraktereg en Handelsreg (1949, with J.P. Yeats) and Strafreg (1948, with H.L. Swanepoel), which saw several re-editions until the 1980s. With these works, de Wet abandoned the prevailing tradition of constructing legal rules from case law. Inspired by European civil law, he sought instead to construct a consistent framework of terms and principles to serve as a benchmark for case law itself.

Through his work, de Wet enhanced the status of his native Afrikaans by making it a language of scientific legal discourse. His influence particularly on the law of contracts and on penal law was immense. Finally, his intellectual approach, characterised by critical rationalism and self-assurance, had a liberating impact in the intellectual climate of apartheid-era South Africa.

References

Footnotes

1912 births
1990 deaths
South African jurists